The U.S. state of Maryland first required its residents to register their motor vehicles in 1904. Registrants provided their own license plates for display until 1910, when the state began to issue plates.

Plates are currently issued by the Motor Vehicle Administration of the Maryland Department of Transportation. Front and rear plates are required for most classes of vehicles, while only rear plates are required for motorcycles and trailers, as well as classes L (historic, 20+ years and unaltered) and N (street rod, 25+ years and altered) that are at least 50 years old.

Passenger baseplates

1910 to 1970
The 1956 (expired March 31, 1957) issue was the first Maryland license plate that complied with these standards.

1970 to present

Optional plates

Non-passenger plates
Multi-purpose vehicles (such as minivans and sport utility vehicles), as well as pickup trucks and cargo vans, have traditionally been issued separate plate types. However, since June 14, 2010, trucks and multi-purpose vehicles have been issued passenger plates with the same serial format, first on the War of 1812 commemorative base and currently on the "Maryland Proud" base.

Government plates
Plates issued to local and state government agencies, including police and transit buses operated by a city or county or the state (for City of Baltimore).

Temporary plates

Organization plates

See also

List of non-passenger and special vehicle registration plates of Maryland

References

Further reading
"Maryland license plates, 1969–present" (June 16, 2017), by David Nicholson, Christopher Jackson, and Jeff Ellis, License Plates of North America, 1969–present

External links

Maryland
Transportation in Maryland
Maryland transportation-related lists